Heimarka is a plain at Barentsøya, Svalbard. It is located between the glacier of Besselsbreen and the valley of Grimdalen. The lake of Veslemjøsa is situated in the field.

References

Plains of Svalbard
Barentsøya